Sir John Nicholas Henderson,  (1 April 191916 March 2009), known as Nicko Henderson, was a British diplomat and writer, who served as British Ambassador to the United States from 1979 to 1982.

Life and career
Henderson was born in London, the only son and second of three children of Sir Hubert Henderson, a prominent political economist and later Drummond Professor of Political Economy at Oxford, and of Faith Marion Jane Henderson, née Bagenal.

Nicholas was educated at Stowe School and Hertford College, Oxford, and was the President of the Oxford Union. Childhood tuberculosis disqualified him from military service during World War II. Instead, in 1942, he joined the Cairo staff of Lord Moyne, Minister Resident in the Middle East, on a temporary basis. In 1944, he was appointed Assistant Private Secretary to the Foreign Secretary, Sir Anthony Eden, and then to Ernest Bevin.

He joined the British Diplomatic Service in 1946 and rose to become Private Secretary to the Foreign Secretary in 1963. Subsequently, he served as British Ambassador to Poland, Germany and finally France, from which post he retired in 1979 on his sixtieth birthday.

Valedictory dispatch and Ambassadorship to the United States 
Upon retiring (as he thought) from the foreign service when relinquishing his post in Paris, he wrote a final dispatch titled "Britain's decline; its causes and consequences". The Economist obtained a copy and printed it in the same year, stating "The despatch does not, needless to say, reach us from him and was presumably written for very limited circulation. But it is so unusually forthright and timely, particularly in its middle and concluding passages on British policy in Europe, under governments of every stripe, as to merit publication virtually in full."

A surprise extension to Henderson's career came about because of the election of Margaret Thatcher as Prime Minister in May of that year. Thatcher invited him to return to service as Ambassador to Washington, where he served until 1982. She had first asked Edward Heath to take up the post, but he had refused the offer. Henderson was enormously popular in Washington, and he and his wife Mary formed a close personal friendship with President Ronald Reagan at a crucial time in the latter's presidency, oiling the special friendship which developed between Reagan and Margaret Thatcher. In particular, he was successful in putting forward the British side of the Falklands War in 1982, and maintaining friendly relations between the nations when that friendship was under some strain.

In retirement, Henderson wrote several books on history, and an account of his career as a diplomat, Mandarin. He held directorships of several major British companies, including the Channel Tunnel Group, Sotheby's, and Hambros. He also had close ties with the Prince of Wales, serving as Lord Warden of the Stannaries and Chairman of the Prince's Council (the body which oversees the Duchy of Cornwall) after retiring from the Diplomatic Service. He was appointed KCVO for this service to the Crown. He gave the Romanes Lecture in Oxford in 1986.

In 1951, Henderson married Mary Barber (née Cawadias), a Greek-born former war correspondent for Time-Life. She died in 2004. Their only child, Alexandra Nicolette, married the photographer Derry Moore, now the 12th Earl of Drogheda. As Alexandra Henderson, she has followed a career as a television and radio producer specialising in current affairs.

He was generally known as "Nicko (sp. "Nico" in Lady Thatcher's memoirs) Henderson" in private life.

Bibliography
 Prince Eugen of Savoy. Weidenfeld & Nicolson, (1966). 
The Birth of NATO, 1982
The Private Office, 1984
Channels and Tunnels: Reflections on Britain and Abroad (1987)
Diplomatic Immunity: Principles, Practices, Problems by Grant McClanahan with a foreword by Sir Nicholas Henderson (Hurst & Co. for the Institute for the Study of Diplomacy, Georgetown University, 1989). 
Mandarin, The Diary, 1994
Old Friends and Other Instances, 2000
The Private Office Revisited, 2001

In popular culture
Henderson was portrayed by Jeremy Clyde in the 2002 BBC production of Ian Curteis's controversial The Falklands Play.

Diplomatic posts and offices

References

External links
The Daily Telegraph obituary
The Guardian obituary
The Independent obituary
The Times obituary
Appearance on Desert Island Discs (2 June 1989)
Interview with Sir John Nicholas Henderson & transcript, British Diplomatic Oral History Programme, Churchill College, Cambridge, 1998

Alumni of Hertford College, Oxford
Ambassadors of the United Kingdom to West Germany
Ambassadors of the United Kingdom to Poland
Ambassadors of the United Kingdom to France
Ambassadors of the United Kingdom to the United States
Members of HM Diplomatic Service
Knights Commander of the Royal Victorian Order
Knights Grand Cross of the Order of St Michael and St George
People educated at Stowe School
Presidents of the Oxford Union
1919 births
2009 deaths
Private secretaries in the British Civil Service
Principal Private Secretaries to the Secretary of State for Foreign and Commonwealth Affairs
20th-century British diplomats